Rapp is an unincorporated community in Mingo County, West Virginia, United States. Their Post Office  no longer exists.

References 

Unincorporated communities in West Virginia
Unincorporated communities in Mingo County, West Virginia